The 1967 National Hockey League (NHL) expansion added six new franchises for the 1967–68 season, doubling the size of the league to 12 teams. It was the largest expansion undertaken at one time by an established major sports league and the first change in the composition of the NHL since 1942, ending the era of the Original Six. 

The six new teams were the Los Angeles Kings, Minnesota North Stars, Oakland Seals, Philadelphia Flyers, Pittsburgh Penguins, and St. Louis Blues. This expansion, including placing two new clubs on the West Coast, was the result of the league's fears of a rival league that would challenge the NHL for players and the Stanley Cup. In addition, the league hoped that the expansion would result in a lucrative TV contract in the United States.

The Seals, later renamed the California Golden Seals and then the Cleveland Barons, are the only team from the expansion to cease operations and not reach the Stanley Cup. The Blues, Flyers, Kings, and Penguins continue to operate in their home cities, while the North Stars would relocate to Dallas, Texas and become the Dallas Stars. All active teams have won the Stanley Cup at least once, with the Penguins holding the most Cup titles among the 1967 expansion franchises at five.

Background 

In the aftermath of the shakeout caused by the Depression and World War II, in which the National Hockey League contracted from ten teams to the so-called "Original Six" clubs (Boston Bruins, Montreal Canadiens, Toronto Maple Leafs, New York Rangers, Detroit Red Wings and Chicago Black Hawks), the NHL became immensely profitable. Professional sports teams of the era were primarily gate-driven enterprises; however, attendances consistently rose after the end of the war. With arenas that generally held around 15,000 spectators in this era selling out with increasing frequency, the league expanded the schedule from the wartime 50 games to 70 games by the 1950's. Meanwhile, owners aggressively kept costs (especially player salaries) as low as possible and ruthlessly suppressed all attempts by the players to unionize, in particular when they perceived a threat by the organizing efforts of Red Wings star Ted Lindsay.

As the NHL stabilized, it came under the control of a few wealthy tycoons, in particular the powerful Norris family. James E. Norris, the owner of the Red Wings, effectively controlled the league's other three American teams as well. After the elder Norris died in 1952, this control was exercised by his son James D. Norris. NHL owners staunchly resisted applications to expand beyond six franchises. Groups representing Philadelphia (which had secured rights to the dormant Montreal Maroons franchise), Los Angeles and the AHL Cleveland Barons were each in turn given conflicting requirements that seemed to contemporary observers designed to disqualify the bids, and it was widely understood that the existing NHL owners wanted no encroachments upon their profits.

The NHL had been an early leader in television broadcasting, both in Canada and the U.S. However, by 1960, its TV contracts had expired, and the league had none until 1963. The owners saw that the televising of other sports had enhanced the images of those leagues' players, and feared that this would provide leverage at salary time. Already, players were starting to get legal help in negotiating contracts. Additionally, the league did not want to change game start times to suit the networks.

In 1965, the NHL was told that it would not receive a US television contract without expansion and that the networks were considering televising games from the Western Hockey League, an ostensibly-minor league that had by then expanded into several large West Coast markets and accumulated strong rosters of players excluded from the static NHL lineups of the era. Because of that and a generally favorable environment for alternative sports leagues (the American Football League had become a rousing success around the same time, and the abortive Continental League nonetheless had a role in the expansion of baseball), the NHL's control over major professional hockey was legitimately threatened.

Fears of the WHL becoming a rival major league and the desire for a lucrative television contract in the US much like the ones Major League Baseball and the National Football League had secured, wore down the opposition. Even James D. Norris eventually relented, although he ultimately died in 1966 before any expansion teams had commenced play. As more conservative owners retired, a younger guard more receptive to expansion, such as Stafford Smythe in Toronto, David Molson in Montreal, and William M. Jennings in New York, took power.

Expansion teams 

In 1963, Rangers governor William Jennings introduced to his peers the idea of expanding the league to the American West Coast by adding two new teams for the 1964–65 season. His argument was based around concerns that the Western Hockey League intended to operate as a major league in the near future. He also hoped that teams on the west coast would make the league truly national, and improve the chances of returning to television in the United States as the NHL had lost its deal with CBS. While the governors did not agree to the proposal, the topic of expansion arose every time the owners met from then on out.

The expansion process formally began in March 1965, when NHL President Clarence Campbell announced that the league proposed to expand its operations through the formation of a second six-team division. San Francisco – Oakland and Vancouver were declared "acceptable cities" with Los Angeles and St. Louis as potential sites. In February 1966, the NHL Board of Governors considered applications from 14 different ownership groups, including five from Los Angeles, two from Pittsburgh, and one each from Minneapolis – Saint Paul, Philadelphia, San Francisco – Oakland, Baltimore, Buffalo, and Vancouver. Cleveland and Louisville had also expressed previous interest but were not represented.

Six franchises were ultimately added: the California Seals (San Francisco – Oakland), Los Angeles Kings, Minnesota North Stars, Philadelphia Flyers, Pittsburgh Penguins, and St. Louis Blues. Had one of the teams been unable to start, a franchise would have then been awarded to Baltimore. Four of those teams are still playing in their original cities under their original names. In 1978, the North Stars merged with the Cleveland Barons, who were the relocated Seals, and in 1993 the North Stars became the Dallas Stars. Both the San Francisco-Oakland market and the Minneapolis-St. Paul markets were eventually granted new teams as the San Jose Sharks and the Minnesota Wild.

Opposition 

Canadian fans, including Prime Minister Lester Pearson, were irate that no Canadian teams were added, particularly since Vancouver had been generally considered a lock for a team. Internal considerations took a hand in that since as Montreal and Toronto were not interested in sharing CBC television revenues with another Canadian club, and Chicago owner Arthur Wirtz's support was reputedly contingent on the creation of a St. Louis team, although that city had not submitted a formal bid, to purchase the decrepit St. Louis Arena, which the Black Hawks ownership then also owned. Buffalo also nearly got a team over nearby Pittsburgh until Pittsburgh Steelers owner Art Rooney, who would serve as a minority investor in the Penguins early years, persuaded the Norris brothers, whom he knew through their common interest in horse racing, to vote for Pittsburgh in the expansion process. Vancouver and Buffalo both subsequently received teams for the NHL's next expansion in 1970.

On a more general note, many traditionalists resisted expansion, claiming it would dilute the talent in the league. Even some proponents of expansion were worried at the idea of immediately doubling the NHL's size and wanted to ease teams in gradually, as Major League Baseball was doing.

The expansion fee was US$2 million, and players taken in the very strict expansion draft came at a cost of $50,000 each. Experts tended to see that as high, and most expansion teams were seen as having no hope of competing successfully with the established teams in the near future.

Because of the inherent competitive imbalance, there was some support for the idea of placing the new teams in a completely separate division or conference, with a separate schedule for the first few seasons and then gradually integrating the new teams into the established NHL, much like the then-progressing AFL-NFL merger was being carried out. Ultimately, the league partly implemented the idea by placing all six of the new teams in the new West Division. Alternative proposals included putting Detroit and Chicago in the West with Pittsburgh and Philadelphia going to the East. In a surprising concession, the league also agreed to implement a strictly divisional playoff bracket, meaning that four expansion teams would make the playoffs, and an expansion team was guaranteed a slot in the Stanley Cup Finals.

Changes 

The new teams offered a big change to the league. After seeing virtually the same red/blue/black uniforms for over 20 years, purple, green, sky blue, and orange were introduced. Teams now regularly travelled between cities by air because of the distances involved; at the time, all of the Original Six cities had daily overnight passenger rail service between one another.

Aftermath 
The 1967 expansion marked the end of the Original Six era and the beginning of a new era of the NHL. The expansion, Bobby Orr's record $1 million contract in 1971, and the formation of the World Hockey Association (WHA) in 1972 forever changed the landscape of the North American professional game. It was the WHA that ended up being the NHL's chief rival during the 1970s, while the Western Hockey League ceased operations in 1974. The NHL's first expansion period ended in 1974 by which time the league had tripled in size to 18 teams, and then merged with the WHA by absorbing four of its teams in 1979. As a result, the NHL retained its status as the premier professional ice hockey league in North America; no other league has attempted to compete against the NHL since then.

However, the NHL's other goal of immediately securing a lucrative TV contract in the U.S. similar to MLB and the NFL never fully materialized until decades later. Despite the expansion and the subsequent merger with the WHA, NHL broadcasting on a national scale in the U.S. continued to be spotty between 1967 and 1981. Although NBC and CBS held rights at various times, neither network carried anything close to a full schedule, even carrying only selected games of the Stanley Cup Finals. 

All the 1967 expansion teams were placed in the same division in 1967–68, so their success was largely gauged relative to each other before the 1974 realignment, which radically mixed up all of the league's teams into four divisions and two conferences. Subsequent expansions and realignments separated both the Original Six and the 1967 expansion teams even further, essentially reviving the league's earlier alternative plan to put Detroit and Chicago in the West, and Pittsburgh and Philadelphia in the East. After the 1998 realignment, which reorganized the league into six divisions, only the Flyers and the Penguins are in the same division. When the league realigned again in 2013 to a different four division setup, the Stars and Blues were placed in the same division.

The St. Louis Blues immediately made an impact by appearing in three consecutive Stanley Cup Finals in the first three years, but were swept in each. Their first Stanley Cup title in  came 49 years after their previous finals appearance. Although they were the first team from the expansion to reach the finals, the Blues were the last of the five active 1967 teams to win the Stanley Cup.

After the 1969–70 season, the league moved Chicago to the West Division and altered the playoff format to force Eastern and Western teams to face each other prior to the final. It would not be until 1974 when an expansion team would best an Original Six team in a playoff series or even reach the Final again. That season, the Philadelphia Flyers, who had steadily built a strong team, would go on to defeat Boston to win the Stanley Cup. They would repeat as champions in 1975 by defeating the Buffalo Sabres in the first modern Stanley Cup Final to not feature an Original Six club. As of the end of the 2016–17 NHL season, which marked the 50th season for the 1967 expansion teams, the Flyers are the most successful of the expansion team in terms of all-time points percentage (.576), second only to the Montreal Canadiens (.590) in NHL history. Additionally, the Flyers have the most appearances in the league semi-finals (known as the conference finals since the  season) out of all 26 expansion teams with 16 and the most Stanley Cup Finals appearances with a total of eight.

The Pittsburgh Penguins were largely unsuccessful in the beginning, failing to win their division until the 1990–91 season, but accumulated draft picks and built a strong team that would win two consecutive Stanley Cups in 1991 and 1992. In 2009, the Penguins became the first of the 1967 expansion teams to win three Cups. Then in 2016, Pittsburgh tied the New York Rangers (an Original Six team) and the New York Islanders (a 1972 expansion team) with four Cups. After successfully defending their title the following year, the franchise tied the Edmonton Oilers (at five Cups), with the Oilers joining the league in the 1979 merger with the WHA.

The Los Angeles Kings did not make a Stanley Cup Finals appearance until 1993 during the Wayne Gretzky era. The Kings did not return to the Cup Finals again until 2012, when they finally won their first Cup. Los Angeles won the Cup again in 2014.

While four of the 1967 expansion teams still play in their original cities, one has relocated and one ceased operations. The Oakland/San Francisco Bay Area-based franchise was the least successful of the 1967 expansion teams: noncompetitive both on the ice and at the box office, the club eventually moved to Cleveland to become the Barons in 1976. While the Minnesota North Stars were in a traditional hockey area, the team was struggling financially. In 1978, the two ownership groups merged the franchises into the North Stars with the Barons' owners Gordon and George Gund III becoming the majority owners of the team. Although, the merged North Stars improved on the ice and made two finals appearances in 1981 and 1991, they continued to have financial difficulties.

In late 1980s, the Gunds attempted to relocate the North Stars to the Bay Area, but were denied by the league. The NHL and the Gunds came to a compromise with the Gunds selling the North Stars and were given an expansion team that became the San Jose Sharks in 1991. As part of the compromise, the North Stars and Sharks had a player dispersal and expansion draft in which the North Stars' roster was split between the two teams and then each took part in the expansion draft. The new owners of the North Stars only kept the team in Minnesota for two more seasons and moved to Dallas, Texas, in 1993 to become the Dallas Stars, eventually winning their first Cup in 1999. The NHL returned to the Twin Cities market when the Minnesota Wild began play in 2000.

50th Anniversary season
During the 2016–17 NHL season, the four "expansion six" teams still in their original cities had festivities commemorating their 50th year in the NHL and each unveiled uniform patches to be worn by those teams. The patches were unveiled on February 9, 2016, on the 50th anniversary of the NHL awarding the franchises, which led the Penguins to unveil a patch with three Stanley Cups. With the Penguins winning that year's Stanley Cup Finals, their patch was modified to have four Cups. The season ended with the Penguins clinching their fifth Cup.

Timeline of the 1967 expansion teams 
Among the six 1967 expansion teams, four still play in their original cities. One has since relocated, while the other relocated and then was merged out of existence.

See also 
1967 NHL Expansion Draft
History of the National Hockey League
History of the National Hockey League (1967–1992)
History of organizational changes in the NHL

References 

Expansion
California Golden Seals
Los Angeles Kings
Minnesota North Stars
National Hockey League expansion
History of the Philadelphia Flyers
Pittsburgh Penguins
St. Louis Blues